The following outline is provided as an overview of and topical guide to Edinburgh:

Edinburgh –

General reference 
 Pronunciation: ;  ; 
 Common English name(s): Edinburgh
 Official English name(s): Edinburgh
 Adjectival(s): Edinburgensian
 Demonym(s): Edinburger

Geography of Edinburgh 

Geography of Edinburgh
 Edinburgh is:
 a city
 capital of Scotland
 Population of Edinburgh: 507,170 
 Area of Edinburgh: 264 km2 (102 sq mi)

Location of Edinburgh 

 Edinburgh is situated within the following regions:
 Northern Hemisphere and Western Hemisphere
 Eurasia 
 Europe (outline)
 Northern Europe 
 United Kingdom (outline)
 Scotland
 Time zone(s): 
 Greenwich Mean Time (UTC±0)
 In Summer: British Summer Time (UTC+01)

Environment of Edinburgh 

 Climate of Edinburgh

Natural geographic features of Edinburgh 

 Canals in Edinburgh
 Union Canal
 Firths in Edinburgh
 Firth of Forth
 Hills in Edinburgh
 Arthur's Seat
 Blackford Hill
 Braid Hills
 Calton Hill
 Castle Rock
 Corstorphine Hill
 Craiglockhart Hill
 The Mound
 Pentland Hills
 Islands in Edinburgh
 Cramond Island
 Inchmickery
 Lakes in Edinburgh
 Blackford Pond
 Duddingston Loch
 Rivers in Edinburgh
 Braid Burn
 River Almond
 Water of Leith

Areas of Edinburgh 

Abbeyhill
Alnwickhill
Ardmillan
Baberton
Balerno
Balgreen
Bankhead
Barnton
Beechmount
Bingham
Blackford
Blackhall
Bonaly
Bonnington
Burghmuirhead
Braepark
Broomhouse
Broughton
Brunstane
Bruntsfield
Bughtlin
Burdiehouse
The Calders
Cameron Toll
Cammo
The Canongate
Canonmills
Chesser
Church Hill
Clermiston
Colinton

Comely Bank
Comiston
Corstorphine
Craigcrook
Craigentinny
Craigleith
Craiglockhart
Craigmillar
Cramond
Crewe Toll
Currie
Curriehill
Dalmeny
Dalry
Davidson's Mains
Dean Village
Drumbrae
Drylaw
Duddingston
Dumbiedykes
East Craigs
East Pilton
Eastfield
Edinburgh Park
Fairmilehead
Ferniehill
Firrhill
Forrester
Fountainbridge
Gilmerton
Gogar

Gogarloch
Goldenacre
Gorgie
The Grange
Grassmarket
Granton
Greenbank
Greendykes
Greenhill
Haymarket
Hermiston
Holy Corner
Holyrood
Holyrood Park
Ingliston
Inverleith
Jock's Lodge
Joppa
Juniper Green
Kaimes
Kingsknowe
Kirkliston
Lauriston
Leith
Liberton
Little France
Lochend
Lochrin
Longstone
Marchmont
Maybury

Mayfield
Meadowbank
The Meadows
Merchiston
Moredun
Morningside
Mortonhall
Mountcastle
Muirhouse
Murrayfield
New Town
Newbridge
Newcraighall
Newhaven
Newington
Niddrie
Northfield
Old Town
Oxgangs
Parkgrove
Parkhead
Piershill
Pilrig
Pilton
Polwarth
Portobello
Powderhall
Prestonfield
Ratho
Ratho Station
Ravelston

Redford
Restalrig
Riccarton
Roseburn
Saughton
Sciennes
Seafield
Shandon
Sighthill
Silverknowes
Slateford
South Gyle
South Queensferry
Stenhouse
Stockbridge
Swanston
Tollcross
Torphin
Trinity
Turnhouse
Tynecastle
Warriston
Waterfront Edinburgh 
West Coates
West Craigs
West End
West Pilton
Wester Broom
Wester Hailes
Western Harbour
Westfield

Locations in Edinburgh 

 Tourist attractions in Edinburgh
 Archaeological sites in Edinburgh
Cramond Roman Fort 
 Museums in Edinburgh
 Shopping areas and markets
 World Heritage Sites in Edinburgh
New Town
Old Town

Bridges in Edinburgh 

Bridges in Edinburgh
 Dean Bridge
 Forth Road Bridge
 Leamington Lift Bridge
 North Bridge
 Queensferry Crossing
 Regent Bridge
 South Bridge
 Edinburgh Vaults
 Victoria Swing Bridge
 Waverley Bridge

Castles in Edinburgh 

Castles in Edinburgh
 Craigmillar Castle
 Edinburgh Castle
 Mons Meg
 Lauriston Castle

Cultural and exhibition centres in Edinburgh 

 Edinburgh International Conference Centre
 Royal Highland Centre

Fortifications in Edinburgh 

 Edinburgh town walls

Fountains in Edinburgh 

 Greyfriars Bobby Fountain
 Ross Fountain

Monuments and memorials in Edinburgh 

 Dugald Stewart Monument
 National Monument of Scotland
 Nelson Monument
 Political Martyrs' Monument
 Scott Monument
 Scottish American Memorial
 Scottish National War Memorial
Scheduled monuments in Edinburgh

Museums and art galleries in Edinburgh 

Museums in Edinburgh
 Fruitmarket Gallery
 Modern Two (Dean Gallery)
 Museum of Edinburgh
 Museum on the Mound
 National Museum of Scotland
 National War Museum
 Queen's Gallery
 Scottish National Gallery
 Scottish National Gallery of Modern Art
 Scottish National Portrait Gallery
 Writers' Museum

Palaces and villas in Edinburgh 

 Holyrood Palace

Parks and gardens in Edinburgh 

 Bruntsfield Links
 Dean Gardens
 Granton Garden
 Holyrood Park
 Jupiter Artland
 King George V Park
 Lochend Park
 London Road Gardens
 Princes Street Gardens
 Regent, Royal and Carlton Terrace Gardens
 Royal Botanic Garden Edinburgh
 The Meadows
 Victoria Park

Public squares in Edinburgh 

 Bristo Square
 Charlotte Square
 George Square
 Grassmarket
 St Andrew Square

Religious buildings in Edinburgh 

 Duddingston Kirk
 Holyrood Abbey
 Old Saint Paul's
 St Giles' Cathedral
 St John's church
 St Mary's Cathedral (Episcopal)
 St Mary's Cathedral (Roman Catholic)
 St Stephen's Church
 Tron Kirk

Secular buildings in Edinburgh 

Listed buildings in Edinburgh
 Archers' Hall
 Bute House
 Canongate Tolbooth
 Central Library
 City Observatory
 Craig House
 The Dome
 The Drum
 Dundas House
 Edinburgh City Chambers
 The Georgian House
 Gladstone's Land
 Gordon Aikman Lecture Theatre
 Governor's House
 The Hub
 Inverleith House
 Longmore House
 Martello Court
 National Library of Scotland
 New Register House
 Old Royal High School
 Our Dynamic Earth
 Panmure House
 Parliament House
 The Pleasance
 Queensberry House
 Royal Scottish Academy Building
 Scottish Parliament Building
 Scottish Storytelling Centre
 St Andrew's House
 Summerhall
 Surgeons' Hall
 Victoria Quay

Streets in Edinburgh 

 Carlton Terrace
 Cockburn Street
 Ferry Road
 George Street
 Leith Walk
 The Pleasance
 Princes Street
 Queen Street
 Regent Terrace
 Royal Mile
 Closes on the Royal Mile
 Royal Terrace
 West Port

Theatres in Edinburgh 

 Church Hill Theatre
 Edinburgh Festival Theatre
 King's Theatre
 Leith Theatre
 Royal Lyceum Theatre
 Traverse Theatre

Demographics of Edinburgh 

Demographics of Edinburgh

Government and politics of Edinburgh 

Politics of Edinburgh

Politics 
 City of Edinburgh Council
 Lord Provost of Edinburgh
 International relations of Edinburgh
 Twin towns and sister cities of Edinburgh

UK Constituencies 

 Edinburgh North and Leith
 Edinburgh East
 Edinburgh South
 Edinburgh South West
 Edinburgh West

Scottish Parliament constituencies 

 Edinburgh Eastern
 Edinburgh Northern and Leith
 Edinburgh Pentlands
 Edinburgh Central
 Edinburgh Western
 Edinburgh Southern

Law and order in Edinburgh 

 Law enforcement in Edinburgh
 Police Scotland

Military in Edinburgh 

 Royal Company of Archers

History of Edinburgh 

History of Edinburgh

History of Edinburgh, by period or event 

Timeline of Edinburgh history

 Prehistory and origin of Edinburgh
 Edinburgh during the Middle Ages (7th to 15th century)
 Edinburgh comes under Scottish rule during the reign of king Indulf (ca. 960)
 King David I establishes the town of Edinburgh as one of Scotland's earliest royal burghs. (ca. 1130)
 Edinburgh during the 17th century 
 Edinburgh during the 18th century 
 Edinburgh during the 19th century 
 Edinburgh during the 20th century

History of Edinburgh, by subject 

 Burning of Edinburgh
 Treaty of Edinburgh

Culture of Edinburgh 

Culture of Edinburgh

Arts in Edinburgh

Architecture of Edinburgh 
Architecture in Edinburgh
 Buildings in Edinburgh
 Tallest buildings in Edinburgh

Cinema of Edinburgh 

 Edinburgh Filmhouse
 Edinburgh International Film Festival

Literature of Edinburgh 

Literature in Edinburgh
 Writers from Edinburgh
 Arthur Conan Doyle
 James Grant
 Walter Scott
 Robert Louis Stevenson

Music of Edinburgh 

Music of Edinburgh
 Music festivals and competitions in Edinburgh
 Edinburgh International Festival
 Music schools in Edinburgh
 City of Edinburgh Music School 
 St Mary's Music School
 Music venues in Edinburgh
 Queen's Hall
 Reid Concert Hall
 St Cecilia's Hall
 Usher Hall
 Musical ensembles in Edinburgh
 Edinburgh Grand Opera
 Edinburgh University Music Society
 Scottish Ballet
 Scottish Chamber Orchestra
 Scottish Opera
 Southern Light Opera Company
 Musicians from Edinburgh
 Alexander Mackenzie
 Songs about Edinburgh
 Flowers of Edinburgh

Theatre of Edinburgh 

Theatre in Edinburgh
 Edinburgh amateur theatre

Visual arts of Edinburgh 

Edinburgh in art / Paintings of Edinburgh

Art in Edinburgh
 The Edinburgh School
 Public art in Edinburgh
 Lion of Scotland
 The Manuscript of Monte Cassino

Cuisine of Edinburgh
 Beer in Edinburgh
 Edinburgh rock
Events in Edinburgh
 Edinburgh's Hogmanay
Festivals in Edinburgh
 Edinburgh festivals
 Royal Edinburgh Military Tattoo
Languages of Edinburgh
 English language
 Scottish English
Media in Edinburgh
 Newspapers in Edinburgh
Edinburgh Evening News
The Edinburgh Gazette
The Scotsman
 Radio and television in Edinburgh
 STV2
People from Edinburgh
Notable residents
People from Edinburgh
 David Hume
 Alexander Nasmyth
 William Henry Playfair

Religion in Edinburgh 

Religion in Edinburgh
 Catholicism in Edinburgh
Roman Catholic Archdiocese of St Andrews and Edinburgh
St Mary's Cathedral
 Protestantism in Edinburgh 
Church of Scotland
Church of Scotland offices
St Giles' Cathedral
 Islam in Edinburgh
 Edinburgh Central Mosque

Sports in Edinburgh 

Sport in Edinburgh
 Baseball in Edinburgh
 Edinburgh Diamond Devils
 Cricket in Edinburgh
 Scotland national cricket team
 Football in Edinburgh
 Association football in Edinburgh
 Edinburgh derby
Edinburgh City F.C.
Heart of Midlothian F.C. (women's team)
Hibernian F.C. (women's team)
Spartans F.C. (women's team)
 Rugby football in Edinburgh
Edinburgh Rugby
Scotland national rugby union team 
 Ice hockey in Edinburgh
 Edinburgh Capitals
 Sports competitions in Edinburgh
 Edinburgh Marathon
 Sports venues in Edinburgh
 Ainslie Park
 Easter Road
 Goldenacre Sports Ground
 Ingliston Racing Circuit
 Inverleith Sports Ground
 Meadowbank Stadium
 Meggetland Sports Complex
 Murrayfield Ice Rink
 Murrayfield Stadium
 Myreside Cricket Ground
 Myreside Stadium
 The Grange Club
 The Royal Burgess Golfing Society of Edinburgh
 Royal Commonwealth Pool
 Tynecastle Park

Economy and infrastructure of Edinburgh 

Economy of Edinburgh
 Business parks in Edinburgh
 Edinburgh Park
 Financial services in Edinburgh
 Edinburgh Stock Exchange
 Royal Bank of Scotland
 Scottish Widows
 Hotels and resorts in Edinburgh
 Balmoral Hotel
 The Dunstane
 Prestonfield House
 The Principal Edinburgh George Street
 The Scotsman Hotel
 Waldorf Astoria Edinburgh - The Caledonian
 Waterloo Hotel
 Restaurants and cafés in Edinburgh
 Forest Café
 The Kitchin
 The Witchery by the Castle
 Shopping malls and markets in Edinburgh
 Shopping malls in Edinburgh
The Gyle Shopping Centre
Jenners
Ocean Terminal
Waverley Market
 Tourism in Edinburgh
 Tourist attractions in Edinburgh

Transportation in Edinburgh 

Public transport in Edinburgh
 Air transport in Edinburgh
 Airports in Edinburgh 
 Edinburgh Airport
 Maritime transport in Edinburgh
 Waterways in Edinburgh
Union Canal 
 Road transport in Edinburgh
 Buses in Edinburgh
Edinburgh Bus Station
Lothian Buses
 Cycling in Edinburgh
 Roads in Edinburgh
 Road network
Edinburgh City Bypass

Rail transport in Edinburgh 

Rail transport in Edinburgh
 Edinburgh Airport Rail Link (proposed line) 
 Railway stations in Edinburgh
 Edinburgh Park railway station
 Edinburgh Waverley railway station
 Haymarket railway station
 Trams in Edinburgh
 Edinburgh Trams
Edinburgh Tram Inquiry
Edinburgh Tram (vehicle)
Proposals for new tram lines in Edinburgh

Education in Edinburgh 

Education in Edinburgh

 Schools in Edinburgh
 Universities and colleges in Edinburgh
 Edinburgh Napier University
 Heriot-Watt University
 University of Edinburgh
 Research institutes in Edinburgh
 Transport Research Institute

Healthcare in Edinburgh 

Healthcare in Edinburgh
 Hospitals in Edinburgh
 Astley Ainslie Hospital
 Chalmers Hospital
 Royal Infirmary of Edinburgh
 Western General Hospital
 Research centres in Edinburgh
 Edinburgh Cancer Research Centre

See also 

 Outline of geography

References

External links 

Edinburgh
Edinburgh